Pebane is a town and transshipment port in Mozambique in the Zambezia Province. The port is in the estuary of the Rio Moniga.

Pebane is a transhipment port for copra. Approximately 3,000t of copra is exported annually.

Sports
Sporting Clube de Pebane

References 

Populated places in Zambezia Province